Heisteria maguirei is a species of plant in the family Olacaceae. It is found in Brazil, Guyana, and Venezuela.

References

Olacaceae
Least concern plants
Taxonomy articles created by Polbot